Erja Helena Lahikainen (born 21 February 1954 in Heinola) is a Finnish politician. She was a Member of the Parliament of Finland from 1991 to 1995, representing the Social Democratic Party of Finland (SDP).

References

1954 births
Living people
People from Heinola
Social Democratic Party of Finland politicians
Members of the Parliament of Finland (1991–95)
20th-century Finnish women politicians